Tours Sisters is the name of a skyscraper project located in Courbevoie in the business district of La Défense (Hauts-de-Seine, France), consisting of a  office tower and a hotel  high connected by a walkway. Construction should begin in 2022, with completion scheduled for 2025. This new project, developed by Unibail-Rodamco and whose architect is Christian de Portzamparc, replaces that of the Phare Tower.

References

External links
 Official website

Skyscrapers in France
Buildings and structures under construction in France
La Défense